Break the Pot is the second studio album by the American rapper Rich Boy. The album was released on April 9, 2013, by Zone 4 Records, Interscope Records and E1 Music. The album features guest appearances from Mista Raja, Maino, Hemi, GQ Beats, Doe B, Playboi Lo, Smash, Maja, Kalenna Harper, Jue and Bobby V.

Background
On January 14, 2013, the first single, "Break the Pot" featuring Hemi, was released to promote the album. On February 25, 2013, it was announced that the album would be released on April 9, 2013, and would feature guest appearances from Maino, Mista Raja, Bobby V, Doe B, Playboi Lo and Smash. On March 17, 2013, the music video for "Break the Pot" featuring Hemi was premiered on MTV Jams. On March 18, 2013, Rich Boy released the mixtape Back To Class to promote the album.

In March 2013, during an interview with HipHopDX, Rich Boy explained the meaning behind the album's title, saying: "I really just got that title from my partner. We were in New York and constantly recording and going back and forth to the studio. He use to joke that we’re about to go break the pot, so I just stuck with it ‘cause it really fit the situation of what I was trying to do musically."

Track listing

Charts

References

2013 albums
Rich Boy albums
E1 Music albums
Vice Records albums